FMN reductase (NADH) (NADH-FMN reductase) is an enzyme with systematic name FMNH2:NAD+ oxidoreductase. This enzyme catalyses the following chemical reaction

 FMNH2 + NAD+  FMN + NADH + H+

The enzyme often forms a complex with monooxygenases.

References

External links 
 

EC 1.5.1
Enzymes